Pajama Sam 2: Thunder and Lightning Aren't so Frightening is a children's point-and-click adventure game originally released for Windows and Macintosh in July 1998. This game was ported to Android under the title Pajama Sam: Thunder and Lightning in April 2014. A Nintendo Switch version was released on February 10, 2022, followed by the PlayStation 4 version on the PlayStation Store in November. The second game of the Pajama Sam franchise, it features the title character entering the World Wide Weather through his attic to stop the scary thunder and lightning.

Plot
Sam is watching an episode of the Pajama Man animated series, when a thunderstorm spooks him. Fed up with his astraphobia, Sam dons his cape and goes into his attic to stop the "thunder storming business". He finds himself in the clouds outside of World Wide Weather, the company that produces the weather. Bill Gate, the guard, forbids Sam from entering due to the "No visitors" rule, so Sam crawls into a crate (after prying it open with a crowbar) and Rudy Beagle, the Forklift Truck, carries the crate into World Wide Weather. After crawling out of the crate, Sam finds an Employee ID card, before entering World Wide Weather.

After using the ID card to get in the Master Control Room (the scanner eats the card), Sam enters and tries to confront Thunder and Lightning, twin sisters (resembling a gray cloud and a lightning bolt respectively), who are responsible for the thunderstorms. He soon is surprised to find that Thunder and Lightning are quite friendly and that thunderstorms are very beneficial. While trying to step closer, Sam trips over his cape and accidentally lands on a red button that makes the weather go out of control and shakes four pieces on each of the weather machines loose. Sam volunteers to help by finding the four missing pieces: the Wingnut, the Velocimomometer, the Y-Pipe and the Snowflake Inspector, while Thunder and Lightning work on the Incident Report.

As Sam progresses with fixing the machines, Thunder and Lightning compliment him on his hard work. After Sam fixes two machines, Thunder and Lightning send the Incident Report to Mother Nature, the president of W.W.W., and work on the Deniability Report. After Sam fixes a third machine, Mother Nature calls, suspicious that something is going on with the weather, and says that she is coming to make an inspection. Sam reassures the worried Thunder and Lightning that he will fix the last machine as soon as possible. Soon, Mother Nature arrives as Thunder and Lightning try to stall her. Fortunately, Sam fixes the last machine just in time for Mother Nature to find that the weather is just fine. She leaves, telling Thunder and Lightning to keep up the good work. Thunder and Lightning thank Sam for saving their jobs and let him control the weather as a reward.

Gameplay Elements 
An optional second quest of this game is to find all 16 missing pieces of Sam's jigsaw puzzle, which will form an amusing picture when they are all collected.

This game employs multiple scenarios to play. Each of the four weather machine parts can be found in one of two locations which are completely random, although the player can now choose from several combination of scenarios to play with at the options screen.

Reception
Pajama Sam 2 received generally positive reviews upon release, but critics noted the game wasn't as good as the first. Pajama Sam 2 got 8.1/10 from IGN, 5 out 5 stars from Review Corner, 7/10 from Unikgamer, 4 out of 5 stars from Adventure Gamers and 4 out of 5 stars from MacHome. Review Corner gave this game the Award of Excellence. GameRankings gave the game an aggregated review score of 90% based on only a single review from a defunct website called Quandary.

References

External links
 
 Pajama Sam 2: Thunder and Lightning Aren't so Frightening at Humongous Entertainment

1998 video games
Android (operating system) games
Children's educational video games
Classic Mac OS games
Humongous Entertainment games
Infogrames games
IOS games
Linux games
MacOS games
Nintendo Switch games
Point-and-click adventure games
ScummVM-supported games
Single-player video games
Video games developed in the United States
Windows games
Tommo games
UFO Interactive Games games